Lalit Suri was an Indian politician. He was a Member of Parliament, representing Uttar Pradesh in the Rajya Sabha the upper house of India's Parliament as an Independent politician.

Being the Chairman of the Bharat Hotels chain now known as LaLiT, he was the single-largest hotel owner owning around 1600 rooms. His hotel chain encompasses seven hotels including the flagship InterContinental The Grand in Delhi along with other six Grand hotels in Mumbai, Goa, Bangalore, Srinagar, Udaipur and Khajuraho.
He died at the age of 59 on October 10, 2006, in London.

References

Rajya Sabha members from Uttar Pradesh
Independent politicians in India
1947 births
2006 deaths